Michael S. Braasch is a scientist in the field of GPS navigation. He is a professor at Ohio University and a fellow of the IEEE and ION.

Education 
Braasch obtained a bachelor's degree in electrical engineering in 1988. He continued his studies, receiving a master's degree a year later. Braasch received a PhD in electrical engineering in 1992. All his degrees are from Ohio University.

Career 
Braasch holds the William F. Thomas Professorship at Ohio University, a seat he has held since 2004. His work on GPS multipath mitigation and Selective Availability is held to high regard in the scientific community. He is also director of Ohio University's Avionics Engineering Center where he has been a researcher since 1985. Outside of Ohio University, Braasch has worked with the Delft University of Technology, the University of Canterbury and NATO AGARD. He has been a member of ION since 1989. Braasch has served as an advisor to the Federal Aviation Administration and International Civil Aviation Organization.

Awards and honors 

 1992 RTCA William E. Jackson Award for the best dissertation in the avionics area.
 Made a Fellow of ION in 2009.
 Elevated to a Fellow of the IEEE in 2023 "for contributions to GPS multipath error characterization and mitigation".

References

External links 

 Braasch's website

Fellow Members of the IEEE
Ohio University alumni
Living people
Year of birth missing (living people)